James Harvey "Red" Bowser (September 20, 1881 – May 22, 1943) was an outfielder in Major League Baseball for the Chicago White Sox.

Biography
Bowser was born in Freeport, Pennsylvania, and started his professional baseball career in 1908. He played for the Flint Vehicles of the Southern Michigan League. After two seasons with batting averages of .272 and .284, Bowser was the star of the SML in 1910, when he batted .342, slugged .569, and hit 14 home runs. He led the league in all three categories and hit more homers than any two other players combined.

Bowser was then purchased by the American League's White Sox and joined the team late in the season. He played in one game for them, going 0 for 2 at the plate. The following season, he returned to the minor leagues. He batted just .246, and his organized baseball career ended in 1912.

Bowser died in Moundsville, West Virginia, at the age of 61.

References

External links

1881 births
1943 deaths
Major League Baseball outfielders
Chicago White Sox players
Flint Vehicles players
Greensburg Red Sox players
Oakland Oaks (baseball) players
Bay City (minor league baseball) players
Jackson Convicts players
Baseball players from Pennsylvania
People from Freeport, Pennsylvania